Chrissy Rogers (née Morgan) is a fictional character in the Channel 4 soap opera Brookside played by Eithne Brown from 1987 to 1991. She was married to Frank Rogers; they had two daughters, Sammy and Katie, and a son, Geoff. She left in 1991 on the collapse on their marriage, but briefly returned two years later, after Frank's death in a car crash.

Character
Chrissy was a fairly politicised character known for her left wing views, which were often similar to those of Bobby Grant. In 1989, she becomes a school governor. The following year, Chrissy attempts to mobilise the neighbours in to protesting against the building of Brookside Parade near their homes, a campaign that is ultimately fruitless. Later in the year, she is made redundant; however, she later gets a job as a school secretary.

Reception
In 1998, writers from Inside Soap published an article about the top ten characters they wanted to return to soap. Chrissy was featured and they described her as "Katie's strong-willed mother who outgrew her marriage to Neanderthal truck driver husband, Frank."

References

Rogers, Chrissy
Rogers, Chrissy
School governors